The Sun Fast 3300 is a French sailboat that was designed by Daniel Andrieu and Guillaume Verdier as a racer-cruiser and first built in 2019. Andrieu optimized the design for the International Rating Certificate rules, while Verdier conducted the  computational fluid dynamics and finite element analysis on the design.

The Sun Fast 3300 is part of the Sun Fast sailboat range and replaced the Sun Fast 3200 in production.

The design was the Sailing World "2020 Boat of the Year: Overall Winner".

Production
The design has been built by Jeanneau in France, since 2019 and remains in production.

Design
The Sun Fast 3300 is a racing keelboat, built predominantly of vacuum infused polyester fiberglass. The fully soft chined hull is a fiberglass-balsa sandwich, while the deck is a fiberglass-foam sandwich. It has a 9/10 fractional sloop rig with a carbon fiber bowsprit, a deck-stepped mast, two sets of swept spreaders and aluminum spars, with discontinuous Dyform rigging. Axxon carbon fiber spars and rod rigging are factory options. The hull has a reverse raked stem, an open plumb transom, dual internally mounted spade-type rudders controlled by a single tiller with an extension and a fixed fin keel. It displaces  and carries  of cast iron and lead ballast.

Two  water ballast tanks are a factory option. These transfer water from the leeward to the windward side tank via twin pumps.

The design has sleeping accommodation for six people, with a two straight settee berths in the main cabin and two aft cabins, each with two berths. The galley is located on the port side just forward of the companionway ladder. The galley is block-shaped and is equipped with a two-burner stove, an ice box and a sink. A navigation station is opposite the galley, on the starboard side. The head is located in the bow cabin.

The Sun Fast 3600 was intended to be raced single or double handed or with a full crew, including for transatlantic racing.

Operational history
The boat was at one time supported by a class club that organized racing events, the Sun Fast Association.

In a 2019 review for Yachting World, Pip Hare wrote, "as soon as the jib started to drop the kite filled and BOOM! Even with my co-skipper on the front of the boat our bow actually leapt out of the water and we blasted off with some pace. The grin I was wearing sailing under spinnaker actually made my face hurt after a while. This boat is seriously fun, powerful and responsive. We sat at 130° true wind angle, playing in the waves, pushing to the limits – our top speed surfing was 14.3 knots and the other side of the bay arrived far too quickly."

In a 2020 Sail Magazine review, Adam Cort wrote, "underway, what most surprised me most about the Sun Fast 3300 was how well it went to windward. I was also pleased by how much room there was for the five crew we had aboard, this in spite of the spider’s web of control lines running about. Heading up to a 32-degree apparent wind angle in 7 knots quickly produced 5 knots of boatspeed and a lively, responsive helm. As expected, we pounded a little in the chop. But coming about was a piece of cake, and the boat felt wonderfully balanced throughout."

See also
List of sailing boat types

References

External links

Keelboats
2010s sailboat type designs
Sailing yachts
Sailboat type designs by Daniel Andrieu
Sailboat type designs by Guillaume Verdier
Sailboat types built by Jeanneau